Ingia Glacier, is a glacier in Avannaata Municipality, West Greenland.

Geography
It is a marine terminating glacier outlet of the western side of the Greenland Ice Sheet. Its terminus is in the Inngia Fjord, a branch of the Karrat Fjord, Nordost Bay, Baffin Bay, North Atlantic Ocean. 

The Ingia Glacier flows in a NNE / SSW direction, bending roughly southwestwards shortly before its terminus.

See also
List of glaciers in Greenland

References

Glaciers of Greenland